Lexus V8 may refer to:
 Toyota UZ engine, the engine developed for the first Lexus LS400
 Toyota UR engine, the engine that succeeded it in Lexus's flagship sedans